Bongiorni is an Italian surname. Notable people with the surname include:

Anna Bongiorni (born 1993), Italian sprinter
Émile Bongiorni (1921–1949), French footballer
Gabriele Bongiorni (born 1959), Italian footballer
Giovanni Bongiorni (born 1956), Italian sprinter

Italian-language surnames